The Manila American Cemetery and Memorial is located in Fort Bonifacio, Taguig, Metro Manila, within the boundaries of the former Fort William McKinley. It can be reached most easily from the city via EDSA to McKinley Road, then to McKinley Parkway inside the Bonifacio Global City. The Nichols Field Road is the easiest access from Manila International Airport to the cemetery.

The cemetery,  or 615,000 square metres in area, is located on a prominent plateau, visible at a distance from the east, south and west.  With a total of 17,206 graves, it has the largest number of graves of any cemetery for U.S. personnel killed during World War II and holds war dead from the Philippines and other allied nations.  Many of the personnel whose remains are interred or represented were killed in New Guinea, or during the Battle of the Philippines (1941–42) or the Allied recapture of the islands.  The headstones are made of marble which are aligned in eleven plots forming a generally circular pattern, set among a wide variety of tropical trees and shrubbery. The Memorial is maintained by the American Battle Monuments Commission.

The cemetery is open daily to the public from 9:00 a.m. to 5:00 p.m. except December 25 and January 1.

Otherwise, this cemetery has only one Commonwealth War Dead burial in World War I.

General layout
The entrance to the cemetery is at the far (east) side of the large grassed circle just beyond the military sentinel's post which is at the junction of Rizal Drive and Eighth Avenue. Immediately beyond the gate is the plaza with its circular fountain; at the right is the Visitors' Building. Stretching from the plaza to the memorial is the central mall, which is lined with mahogany trees (Swietenia macrophylla). Circular roads leading eastward and westward through the graves area join the straight roads along the edges of the mall.

The memorial
Twenty-five large mosaic maps in four rooms recall the actions of the United States Armed Forces in the Pacific, China, India and Burma. Carved in the floors are the seals of the American states and its territories.

Notable burials and memorials
Twenty-three Medal of Honor recipients are buried or memorialized at the Manila cemetery. Also honored are the five Sullivan Brothers, who perished when the light cruiser  was sunk in Nov. 1942.  A. Peter Dewey (1916–1945), an OSS officer killed in Saigon shortly after World War II ended, is listed on the Tablets of the Missing. The Camp O'Donnell Memorial is dedicated to the memory of the "Battling Bastards of Bataan".

Medal of Honor recipients

 Burials
 Dale E. Christensen (1920–1944), for action in New Guinea in July 1944
 Leroy Johnson (1919–1944), for action at Leyte, Philippines
 Charles E. Mower (1924–1944), for action at Leyte, Philippines
 Robert A. Owens (1920–1943), for action at Bougainville
 Charles H. Roan (1923–1944), for action at Peleliu Island, Palau
 William H. Thomas (1923–1945), for action in the Zambales Mountains, Luzon, Philippines
 Louis J. Van Schaick (1875–1945), for action against Philippine insurgents in 1901
  Cenotaphs and memorial listings
 Lewis Kenneth Bausell (1924–1944), for action at Peleliu
 Daniel J. Callaghan (1890–1942), for action as commanding officer in the Battle of Guadalcanal
 George F. Davis (1911–1945), for action in the invasion of Lingayen Gulf
 Samuel D. Dealey (1906–1944), for action off of Luzon
 Ernest E. Evans (1908–1944), for action commanding USS Johnston in the Battle off Samar
 Elmer E. Fryar (1914–1944), for action at Leyte, Philippines
 Howard W. Gilmore (1902–1943), for action in the Southwest Pacific
 Robert M. Hanson (1920–1944), for action at Bougainville and New Britain Islands
 Alexander R. Nininger Jr. (1918–1942), for action at Bataan
 Harl Pease Jr. (1917–1942), for action over New Guinea
 Oscar V. Peterson (1899–1942), for action aboard USS Neosho
 Milton E. Ricketts (1913–1942), for action aboard USS Yorktown in the Battle of the Coral Sea
 Albert H. Rooks (1891–1942), for action commanding USS Houston
 Norman Scott (1889–1942), for action as second in command in the Battle of Guadalcanal
 Kenneth N. Walker (1898–1943), for actions commanding the USAAF 5th Bomber Command in the South Pacific Theater
 George Watson (1915–1943), for action near New Guinea
 Raymond H. Wilkins (1917–1943), for action at Simpson Harbor, Rabaul, New Britain
 Cassin Young (1894–1942), for action commanding USS Vestal during the attack on Pearl Harbor

Other notable people
 Rear Admiral Theodore E. Chandler (1894-1945), U.S. Navy, Navy Cross for action aboard USS  in the Invasion of Lingayen Gulf
 Brigadier General James Dalton II (1910–1945), U.S. Army, Distinguished Service Cross for action in the New Guinea campaign (Dalton was killed in action at the Battle of Balete Pass in Luzon, Philippines)
 Lieutenant Commander Hilan Ebert (1903–1942), U.S. Navy, Navy Cross for action aboard USS Northampton in the Battle of Guadalcanal

References

Bibliography
 
 Manila American Cemetery and Memorial

External links

 Manila American Cemetery and Memorial Official Website from the American Battle Monuments Commission including a video and several photos, some in the public domain.
 Manila American Cemetery and Memorial: Many Photographs and Information about the Cemetery and Memorial.
 

1948 establishments in the Philippines
American Battle Monuments Commission
Commonwealth War Graves Commission cemeteries in the Philippines
Monuments and memorials in Metro Manila
Cemeteries in Metro Manila
Landmarks in the Philippines
Tourist attractions in Metro Manila
Bonifacio Global City
World War II memorials
World War II cemeteries
Military cemeteries in the Philippines